Cecco d'Ascoli (1257 – September 26, 1327) is the popular name of Francesco degli Stabili (sometimes given as Francesco degli Stabili Cichus), an Italian encyclopaedist, physician and poet. Cecco (in Latin, Cichus) is the diminutive of Francesco, Ascoli was the place of his birth. The lunar crater Cichus is named after him.

Life

Born in Ancarano, in the modern Abruzzo region (at the time under the jurisdiction of Ascoli), he devoted himself to the study of mathematics and astrology. In 1322 he was made professor of astrology at the University of Bologna. It is alleged that he entered the service of Pope John XXII at Avignon, and that he cultivated the acquaintance of Dante only to quarrel with the great poet afterwards; but of this there is no evidence.

Having published a commentary on the Sphere of John de Sacrobosco, in which he propounded audacious theories concerning the employment and agency of demons, he got into difficulties with the clerical party, and was condemned in 1324 to certain fasts and prayers, and to the payment of a fine of seventy crowns. To elude this sentence he went to Florence, where he was attached to the household of Carlo di Calabria. His freethinking and plain speaking had made him many enemies; he had attacked the Commedia of Dante, and the Canzone d'amore of Guido Cavalcanti. But according to Ernst Cassirer's The Individual and the Cosmos in Renaissance Philosophy, he died at the stake for his attempt to determine the nativity of Christ by reading his horoscope (page 113). The physician Dino del Garbo was indefatigable in pursuit of him; and the old accusation of impiety being renewed, Cecco was again tried and sentenced for relapse into heresy. He was burned at Florence the day after the sentence, in his seventieth year. He was the first university scholar to be burned by the Inquisition.

Publications

Cecco d'Ascoli left many works in manuscript, most of which have never been published. The book by which he achieved his renown and which led to his death was the Acerba (from acervus), an encyclopaedic poem, of which in 1546, the date of the last reprint, more than twenty editions had been issued. It is a compendium for the contemporary natural science of the time, including "the order and influences of the heavens, the characteristics and properties of animals and precious stones, the causes of phenomena such as meteors and earthquakes—and of commonplace moral philosophy". The first book treats of astronomy and meteorology; the second of astrology, of physiognomy, and of the vices and virtues; the third of minerals and of the love of animals; while the fourth propounds and solves a number of moral and physical problems. Of a fifth book, on theology, the initial chapter alone was completed.

Works

References

Bibliography

1257 births
1327 deaths
14th-century Italian physicians
14th-century Italian writers
Italian poets
Italian male poets
People executed for heresy
Executed Italian people
People from the Province of Teramo
Victims of the Inquisition
People executed by Florence
People from Teramo